Deborah Saunt is an Australian-born British architect, urban designer and academic. She co-founded the London-based architecture, urban design and spatial research studio DSDHA with David Hills.

Early life and education 
Saunt was born in New South Wales, Australia, and grew up in Kenya and England. She attended Heriot-Watt University/Edinburgh College of Art and the University of Cambridge.

Saunt gained her PhD with the RMIT University Practice Research Programme, was awarded a Fellowship in the Built Environment from the Royal Commission for the Exhibition of 1851 and has held academic appointments at École polytechnique fédérale de Lausanne and the University of Cambridge.

Career
Saunt's first architectural work was with van Heyningen and Haward followed by a role in the early 1990s on the British Library in London under Colin St John Wilson and MJ Long. She later worked for MJ Long's practice, Long and Kentish, before starting to teach in 1997 at the Architectural Association School of Architecture, the Royal College of Art and at the University of Cambridge. She also worked for Tony Fretton.

Saunt established DSDHA with David Hills. With DSDHA, Saunt has designed a flat-iron building for Bosideng on South Molton Street, a residential block for the Riverside development on the Greenwich Peninsula, an Olympic Village block in East Village, a studio-gallery for Edmund de Waal in West Norwood, and a jewellery studio for Alex Monroe in Bermondsey. In 2009, DSDHA’s St Anne’s SureStart Centre in Colchester was nominated for the EU Mies Van der Rohe Award. Saunt and Hills designed a new building for Christ's College in Guildford, for which they were shortlisted for the RIBA Stirling Prize in 2010.

Saunt is a commissioner for the Independent Transport Commission, a member of the Expert Advisory Group for Historic England, a Board Member of the City Property Association, and was a jury panel member for the international competition to re-imagine London's Grosvenor Square. She has lectured at the Royal Academy of Art and regularly broadcasts on architecture and her belief in the broadest participation in city-making.

She has been included in Forbes 500 and in Evening Standard’s Progress 1000 of the most influential people in London.

Saunt "has always looked beyond the confines of the building" in high-profile spatial strategies, urban masterplans and public realm projects. She is active in the democratisation of architecture and the celebrating the role of women in the profession, setting up the Jane Drew Prize in Architecture and is a Founding Director of the London School of Architecture, where she is now a trustee.

Personal life
Saunt is married to her business partner, David Hills. They live in Clapham with their two children.

References

External links

www.dsdha.co.uk

Living people
Australian expatriates in England
Australian women architects
New South Wales architects
Architects from London
British women architects
Alumni of the University of Cambridge
Alumni of the University of Edinburgh
Alumni of Heriot-Watt University
People from Croydon
Australian emigrants to England
21st-century Australian architects
21st-century British architects
20th-century Australian architects
Year of birth missing (living people)
20th-century Australian women
21st-century Australian women